The InterContinental Amstel Amsterdam Hotel, commonly referred to as the Amstel Hotel, is a hotel in Amsterdam, capital city of the Netherlands, on the east bank of the river Amstel.

The Amstel Hotel is part of the InterContinental Hotels chain. In 2006 the building was sold to Morgan Stanley. In 2011 the Lebanese businessman Toufic Aboukhater bought the hotel. In 2014 the hotel was acquired by Qatar-based Katara Hospitality, but is still operated by the InterContinental Hotels Group

Amenities
Restaurant La Rive had earned one or two Michelin stars in the period 1993–2016.

History
Samuel Sarphati, a physician and city planner, took the initiative to build the hotel, although he died in June 1866 before the hotel opened. The architect was Cornelis Outshoorn. Originally it was planned to build the front of the hotel facing the present Sarphatistraat. Due to financial problems, only the wing along the Amstel was built.

Renovation
In late September 1992, the Amstel Hotel was reopened after a two-year renovation. During the closure, craftsmen, artisans and engineers restored the entire hotel, at a cost of over ƒ70 million. The former 111 rooms were changed in 55 luxury rooms and 24 suites.

In 2017–2018, there was a major renovation of the facade and roof. Beside technical and safety improvements, it was also used to reconstruct the historical looks of the hotel. Both the original colour scheme and the once disappeared lions are now (2018) present again.

In October 2004 a test revealed the presence of legionella in the water system. As a precaution the hotel was evacuated and the guests transferred to other hotels. Several measures were undertaken to prevent a repeat of the incident, including the installation of special filters.

References

Hotels in Amsterdam
Rijksmonuments in Amsterdam
Hotels established in 1867
InterContinental hotels